Shimaya is a Japanese surname. Notable people with the surname include:

, Japanese footballer
, Japanese weightlifter

Japanese-language surnames